The Historical Journal of Film, Radio and Television is an academic journal dedicated to the study of media history. It is published quarterly by Routledge on behalf of the International Association for Media and History. The current editor-in-chief is James Chapman.

This interdisciplinary journal considers mass media from the perspective of historians and social scientists. It covers the impact of mass communications on 20th century history.

See also
 List of film periodicals

External links 
 

History of mass media
Cultural journals
History journals
History of film
History of radio
History of television